The European Convention on Information on Foreign Law is a 1968 Council of Europe treaty whereby states agree to procedures for the mandatory provision of information when a state requests information on the legal system of another state.

Content
States that ratify the Convention appoint a single body to receive requests from other state parties regarding information on the "law and procedure in civil and commercial fields as well as on their judicial organisation". When a request for such information is received from a judicial authority in another state party, the Convention makes it mandatory of the state to provide information in response to the request. States may by individual agreement or declaration expand the categories of information that must be provided.

Creation and state parties
The convention was concluded in London on 7 June 1968 and entered into force 17 December 1969. As of 2019, 43 of the 47 member states of the Council of Europe have ratified the convention; it has also been ratified by Belarus, Costa Rica, Mexico, and Morocco. The five Council of Europe states that have not ratified the convention are Andorra, Armenia, Ireland, and San Marino.

Additional Protocol
On 15 March 1978 the Additional Protocol to the European Convention on Information on Foreign Law was concluded in Strasbourg. The Additional Protocol expands the categories of information that must be provided to encompass "substantive and procedural law and judicial organisation in the criminal field, including prosecuting authorities, as well as on the law concerning the enforcement of penal measures".

The Additional Protocol entered into force on 31 August 1979. As of 2013, it has been ratified by 38 Council of Europe states plus Belarus, Mexico, and Morocco.

See also
List of Council of Europe treaties

External links
European Convention on Information on Foreign Law, Council of Europe information page
Text
Signatures and ratifications
Additional Protocol to the European Convention on Information on Foreign Law, Council of Europe information page
Text (Additional Protocol)
Signatures and ratifications (Additional Protocol)

European Convention on Information on Foreign Law
Council of Europe treaties
European Convention on Information on Foreign Law
European Convention on Information on Foreign Law
European Convention on Information on Foreign Law
Treaties of Albania
Treaties of Austria
Treaties of Azerbaijan
Treaties of Belarus
Treaties of Belgium
Treaties of Bosnia and Herzegovina
Treaties of Bulgaria
Treaties of Costa Rica
Treaties of Croatia
Treaties of Cyprus
Treaties of the Czech Republic
Treaties of Denmark
Treaties of Estonia
Treaties of Finland
Treaties of France
Treaties of Georgia (country)
Treaties of West Germany
Treaties of Greece
Treaties of Hungary
Treaties of Iceland
Treaties of Italy
Treaties of Latvia
Treaties of Liechtenstein
Treaties of Lithuania
Treaties of Luxembourg
Treaties of North Macedonia
Treaties of Malta
Treaties of Mexico
Treaties of Moldova
Treaties of Monaco
Treaties of Montenegro
Treaties of Morocco
Treaties of the Netherlands
Treaties of Norway
Treaties of Poland
Treaties of Portugal
Treaties of Romania
Treaties of the Soviet Union
Treaties of Serbia and Montenegro
Treaties of Slovakia
Treaties of Slovenia
Treaties of Francoist Spain
Treaties of Sweden
Treaties of Switzerland
Treaties of Turkey
Treaties of Ukraine
Treaties of the United Kingdom
Treaties extended to the Faroe Islands
Treaties extended to Greenland
Treaties extended to Clipperton Island
Treaties extended to French Comoros
Treaties extended to French Somaliland
Treaties extended to French Guiana
Treaties extended to French Polynesia
Treaties extended to the French Southern and Antarctic Lands
Treaties extended to Guadeloupe
Treaties extended to Martinique
Treaties extended to Mayotte
Treaties extended to New Caledonia
Treaties extended to Réunion
Treaties extended to Saint Pierre and Miquelon
Treaties extended to Wallis and Futuna
Treaties extended to Aruba
Treaties extended to Jersey